Sotomasuzawa Dam  is a gravity dam located in Iwate Prefecture in Japan. The dam is used for flood control. The catchment area of the dam is 7.5 km2. The dam impounds about 13  ha of land when full and can store 994 thousand cubic meters of water. The construction of the dam was completed in 1961.

See also
List of dams in Japan

References

Dams in Iwate Prefecture